Anton Strålman (born 1 August 1986) is a Swedish professional ice hockey defenceman who is currently playing for the Providence Bruins in the American Hockey League (AHL) while under contract to the Boston Bruins of the National Hockey League (NHL). Strålman has also played in the NHL for the Toronto Maple Leafs, the organization that drafted him in the seventh round, 216th overall, in 2005, as well as the Columbus Blue Jackets, the New York Rangers, the Tampa Bay Lightning, the Florida Panthers, and the Arizona Coyotes.

Playing career

Strålman was selected on 30 July 2005, by the Toronto Maple Leafs as their fifth draft choice, 216th overall. He was picked in the seventh and final round of the post-lockout 2005 NHL Entry Draft. Earlier the same year, on 4 April, Strålman had signed a two-year contract with Timrå IK of the Swedish Elitserien.

During the following 2005–06 season, Strålman adapted to Elitserien quickly and became a team regular. On 20 January 2006, this effort was recognized when he was named the third of four candidates for the 2006 Elitserien Rookie of the Year. The award was eventually won by forward Nicklas Bäckström.

On 16 May 2007, Strålman signed a three-year contract with the Toronto Maple Leafs. He made his North American professional debut on 6 October 2007, with the Toronto Marlies, the American Hockey League (AHL) affiliate of the Maple Leafs, and made his NHL debut on 23 October in a home game against the Atlanta Thrashers. On 21 March 2008, he scored his first career NHL goal in a game against the Buffalo Sabres, then recorded his first multi-goal game against the Montreal Canadiens on 29 March.

During the 2009 off-season, Strålman was traded twice. On 27 July, he was traded to the Calgary Flames, along with Colin Stuart and a seventh-round draft pick in 2012, in exchange for Wayne Primeau and a second-round pick in the 2011. Several months later, on 28 September, he was traded by the Flames to the Columbus Blue Jackets for a third-round pick in 2010.

As a free agent after the 2010–11 season, Strålman was on a try-out contract with the New Jersey Devils, but did not stick with the team when the final team roster was released. On 3 November, he then signed a one-year contract with the New York Rangers.
As a restricted free agent at the end of the season, he initially planned to bring the Rangers to a salary arbitrator, but on 26 July 2012, he signed a two-year, $3.4 million contract with New York. During the 2014 Stanley Cup playoffs, Strålman helped the Rangers reach the 2014 Stanley Cup Finals, where they were ultimately defeated by the Los Angeles Kings in five games.

On 1 July 2014, Strålman left the Rangers organization as an unrestricted free agent and signed a five-year, $22 million contract with the Tampa Bay Lightning. In the 2014–15 season, he set career-highs in goals (9), assists (30) and points (39) in his first season with the Lightning, helping the team reach the 2015 Stanley Cup Finals. During the 2015 Eastern Conference Finals, the Lightning defeated his former team, the Rangers, in seven games.

On 27 November 2015, Strålman played in his 500th career NHL game in a 2–4 Lightning loss to the Washington Capitals. On 25 March 2016, Strålman suffered a non-displaced fracture of his left fibula, during a 7–4 win over the New York Islanders.

On 21 February 2017, Strålman recorded his 200th career NHL point. Strålman's 200th point came in a 4–1 Lightning win over the visiting Edmonton Oilers at Amalie Arena. On 23 February 2017, Strålman skated in his 600th career NHL game.

After five seasons with the Lightning organization, Strålman left as a free agent to sign a three-year, $16.5 million contract with the Florida Panthers on July 1, 2019.

On 26 July 2021, Strålman was traded to the Arizona Coyotes along with Vladislav Kolyachonok and a second-round pick in the 2024 NHL Entry Draft in exchange for a 7th-round pick in the 2023 NHL Entry Draft.

As a free agent at the conclusion of his contract with the Coyotes, Strålman went un-signed over the summer. Approaching the  season, he initially joined the Boston Bruins training camp and pre-season on a professional tryout before agreeing to a one-year, $1 million contract on 11 October 2022.

International play
On 2 March 2016, the Swedish Ice Hockey Association named Strålman to its roster for the 2016 World Cup of Hockey. Strålman was joined by Lightning teammate Victor Hedman. The tournament ran from 17 Sep to 1 October 2016, in Toronto.

On 15 April 2017, the Swedish Ice Hockey Association invited Strålman to its roster for the 2017 IIHF World Championship. However, he was awaiting medical clearance. On 18 April 2017, it was announced that Strålman was cleared to play for team Sweden in the tournament. On May 21, 2017, Strålman helped team Sweden capture gold in a 2-1 victory over Canada.

Career statistics

Regular season and playoffs

International

Awards
Elitserien 2005–06 Rookie of the Year nominee in 2006.

References

External links

1986 births
Living people
Arizona Coyotes players
Boston Bruins players
Columbus Blue Jackets players
Florida Panthers players
New York Rangers players
People from Tibro Municipality
Swedish expatriate ice hockey players in Canada
Swedish expatriate ice hockey players in the United States
Swedish ice hockey defencemen
Tampa Bay Lightning players
Timrå IK players
Toronto Maple Leafs draft picks
Toronto Maple Leafs players
Toronto Marlies players
Sportspeople from Västra Götaland County